Spławy may refer to the following places:
Spławy, Lublin County in Lublin Voivodeship (east Poland)
Spławy, Gmina Józefów nad Wisłą in Lublin Voivodeship (east Poland)
Spławy, Gmina Poniatowa in Lublin Voivodeship (east Poland)